The 2023 Wests Tigers season is the 24th in the club's history. They will compete in the National Rugby League's 2023 Telstra Premiership. The Captain Apisai Koroisau and Head Coach Tim Sheens both start the 2023 NRL Season for the first time ever in their respective club roles.

Player Movement
These movements happened across the previous season, off-season and pre-season.

Gains

Losses

Pre-Season Challenge

Regular Season 
PG = Penalty Goal 
FG = Field Goal

2023 squad

References

Wests Tigers seasons
Wests Tigers season
2023 NRL Women's season